Mantra pushpam is a Vedic hymn that is sung at the time of offering of the flowers to the Hindu deities at the very end of the Pujas. The mantra is considered to be the flower of Vedic chants.  

This mantra is taken from the Taittiriya Aranyakam of the Yajur Veda. It speaks of the unlimited benefits which will be conferred by the secret knowledge of the water, fire, air, the sun, the moon, the stars, the clouds and time. It is normally sung in a chorus by all the Pujaris (priests) together after performing any Puja (worship) or Yajna. It tells in short that water (here water is ether) is the basis of this universe.

Mantra and meaning 

The mantra or the chantings consists of the following hymns

MANTRA:

|| Yo'pam pushpam veda

Pushpavan prajavan pashuvan bhavati

Chandramava Apam pushpam

Pushpavan, Prajavan pashuman bhavati

Ya Evam Veda

Yo pam ayatanam Veda

Ayatanavan bhavati.

MEANING:

He who understands the flowers of water,

He becomes the possessor of flowers, children and animals.

Moon is the flower of the water,

He who understands this fact,

He becomes the possessor of flowers, children and animals.

He who knows the source of water,

Becomes established in himself,

MANTRA:

Agnirva Apamayatanam

Ayatanavan Bhavati

Yo agnerayatanam Veda

Ayatanavan bhavati

Apovagner ayatanam

Ayatanavan bhavati

Ya Evam Veda

Yopa mayatanam Veda

Ayatanavan bhavati

MEANING:

Fire is the source of water,

He who knows this,

Becomes established in himself,

Water is the source of fire,

He who knows this,

Becomes established in himself.

He who knows the source of water,

Becomes established in himself,

MANTRA:

Vayurva Apamaya tanam

Ayatanavan bhavati.

Yova Yorayatanam Veda

Ayatanavan bhavati|

Apovai va yorayatanam

Ayatanavan bhavati.

Ya Evam veda

Yopamayatanam Veda

Ayatanavan Bhavati

MEANING:

Air is the source of water,

He who knows this,

Becomes established in himself,

Water is the source of air,

He who knows this,

Becomes established in himself.

He who knows the source of water,

Becomes established in himself,

MANTRA:

Asouvai tapanna pamayatanam

Ayatanavan bhavati

Yo mushya tapata Ayatanam Veda

Ayatanavan bhavati

Apova Amushyatapata Ayatanam

Ayatanavan bhavati

Ya Evam Veda

Yopa mayatanam Veda

Ayatanavan bhavati

MEANING:

Scorching sun is the source of water,

He who knows this,

Becomes established in himself,

Water is the source of scorching sun,

He who knows this,

Becomes established in himself.

He who knows the source of water,

Becomes established in himself,

MANTRA:

Candrama Vama pamayatnam

Ayatanavan bhavati.

Yashcandra masa Ayatanam Veda

Ayatanavan bhavati

Apovai Candra masa Ayatanam

Ayatanavan bhavati

Ya Evam Veda

Yo pamayatanam veda

Ayatanavan bhavati

MEANING:

Moon is the source of water,

He who knows this,

Becomes established in himself,

Water is the source of moon,

He who knows this,

Becomes established in himself.

He who knows the source of water,

Becomes established in himself,

MANTRA:

Nakshatrani va Apamayatanam

Ayatanavan bhavati

Yo Nakshtrana mayatanam Veda

Ayatanavan bhavati

Apovai Nakshtrana mayatanam

Ayatanavan bhavati

Ye evam Veda

Yopamaya tanam Veda

Ayatanavan bhavati

MEANING

Stars are the source of water,

He who knows this,

Becomes established in himself,

Water is the source of stars,

He who knows this,

Becomes established in himself.

He who knows the source of water,

Becomes established in himself,

MANTRA

Parjanyova apamayatanam

Ayatanavan bhavati

Yah parjanyasya syayatanam Veda

Ayatanavan bhavati

Apovai parjanya Syayatanam

Ayatanavan bhavati

Ye Evam veda

Yopa maya tanam Veda

Ayatanavan bhavati

MEANING:

Clouds are the source of water,

He who knows this,

Becomes established in himself,

Water is the source of clouds,

He who knows this,

Becomes established in himself.

He who knows the source of water,

Becomes established in himself,

MANTRA:

Samvastaro Va Apamayatanam

Ayatavan bhavati

Yassamvatsarasya ayatanam Veda

Ayatavan bhavati.

Apovai samvatsarasya ayatanam

Ayatanavan bhavati

Ya Evam veda

Yopsu Navam pratishtitam veda

Pratyeva tishtati

MEANING:

Rainy season is the source of water,

He who knows this,

Becomes established in himself,

Water is the source of rainy season,

He who knows this,

Becomes established in himself.

He who knows that there is a raft is available,

Becomes established in that raft.

Rajadhirajaya prasahyasahine 
namo vayo vai shravanaya kurmahe 
Same kaman kama kamaya mahyam 
Kameshvarou vai shravano dadatu 
Kuberaya vai shravanaya maharajaya namah ||

References 

Vedic hymns